Overview of the 1990 American Professional Soccer League season.  Although the Western Soccer League and the American Soccer League merged to form the American Professional Soccer League in 1990, the two leagues remained essentially independent leagues, linked by name alone.  During this season, they ran separate regular season schedules with two different points systems.  They each had their own playoff formats, had separate league MVPs and had their own All-League teams.  The first game between the two leagues came in September when the Maryland Bays of the American Soccer League defeated the San Francisco Bay Blackhawks of the Western Soccer League for the American Professional Soccer League championship.

History
On September 9, 1989, the champions of the west coast-based Western Soccer Alliance and the east coast-based American Soccer League played each other for the national championship.  This was the first meeting between teams from the two leagues but was part of a larger effort to merge the two leagues.  This effort resulted in the creation of the American Professional Soccer League on February 22, 1990.  The merger remained one of name only as the two leagues played separate schedules and named separate MVPs and All-League teams.  However, it allowed the teams to market themselves as members of a national league.  During the playoffs, except for the West semifinals and the APSL finals, teams played a home and away series.  However, they needed to win two games, so in the case of a tie after two games, the teams played a thirty-minute mini-game.  If the game remained tied, the two teams would enter a shoot out.  A shoot out pitted a field player against the opposing team's goalkeeper.  The field player had five seconds to take a shot on goal beginning 35 yards from the goal.

League standings

East (American Soccer League) Conference
Points:
Win: 3
Shoot out win: 2
Shoot out loss: 1

Northern Division

Southern Division

West (Western Soccer League) Conference
Points:
Win: 6
Shoot out win: 4
Shoot out loss: 2
1 bonus point per goal scored in regulation, maximum of 3 per game

North Division

South Division

East Conference playoffs

East bracket

Semifinal 1

The Fort Lauderdale Strikers advance to the East Finals.

Semifinal 2

The Maryland Bays advance to the East Finals.

Conference Finals

The Maryland Bays advance to the APSL Championship.

West Conference playoffs

West bracket

First Round Series 1

The Los Angeles Heat advance to the Division Finals.

First Round Series 2

The Colorado Foxes advance to the Division Finals.

Division Finals

The Los Angeles Heat advance to the Conference Finals.

The San Francisco Bay Blackhawks advance to the Conference Finals.

Conference Finals

The San Francisco Bay Blackhawks advance to the APSL Championship.

APSL Final

The Maryland Bays win the APSL Championship.

Combined points leaders

Honors

East (American Soccer League) Conference
 MVP: Philip Gyau
 Leading goal scorer: Mike Masters
 Leading goalkeeper: Dale Caya
 Rookie of the Year: Steve Pittman
 Coach of the Year: Thomas Rongen

First Team All League
 Goalkeeper: Dale Caya
 Defenders: Steve Pittman, Paul Mariner, Brian Ainscough, George Gelnovatch
 Midfielders: Chico Borja, Marcelo Carrera, David Byrne
 Forwards: Philip Gyau, Dan Donigan, Jean Harbor

Second Team All League
 Goalkeeper: Arnie Mausser
 Defenders: Jimmy McGeough, Jr., Chris Reif, Thomas Rongen, Dave Smyth
 Midfielders: Paul Dougherty, Eric Eichmann, Pat O'Kelly
 Forwards: Mike Masters, Bruce Murray, Paul Riley

West (Western Soccer League) Conference
 MVP: Mark Dodd
 Leading goal scorer: Chance Fry
 Leading goalkeeper: Mark Dodd

 First Team All League
 Goalkeeper: Mark Dodd
 Defenders: Marcelo Balboa, John Doyle, Robin Fraser, Danny Pena
 Midfielders: Dominic Kinnear, Fran O'Brien, George Pastor
 Forwards: Chance Fry, Mark Kerlin, Townsend Qin

Second Team All League
 Goalkeeper: Anton Nistl
 Defenders: Steve Eise, Paul Krumpe, Derek Van Rheenen, Wade Webber
 Midfielders: John Bain, Mike Fox, Jeff Rogers, Dzung Tran
 Forwards: Scott Benedetti, Paul Wright

References

External links
 The Year in American Soccer - 1990
 USA - A-League (American Professional Soccer League) (RSSSF)
 1990 Western Soccer League
 1990 American Soccer League

	

APSL/A-League seasons
1